Alexander Horvát (born 25 September 2000) is a Slovak footballer who plays as a midfielder.

Club career
Horvát made his professional Slovak league debut for Spartak Trnava against AS Trenčín on 8 December 2018.

References

External links
 FC Spartak Trnava official club profile 
 Futbalnet profile 
 
 

2000 births
Living people
Slovak footballers
Association football midfielders
FC Spartak Trnava players
Slovak Super Liga players
Sportspeople from Piešťany